Ben Patael (born 2 June 1997) is an Israeli tennis player.

Patael has a career-high ATP singles ranking of 415, achieved on 15 July 2019. He also has a career-high ATP doubles ranking of 1,050, achieved on 27 July 2015.

He has won one ITF Futures singles title and one ITF Futures doubles title.

Patael has represented Israel in the Davis Cup, where he has a win–loss record of 1–2.

Personal life
Patael was born in Rishon Lezion and resides in Netaim, Israel.

Career
In September 2017, Patael won the inaugural Anna and Michael Kahan Family Prize in Ramat Hasharon, defeating Mor Bulis 6-3, 3-6, 6-3 in the boys’ final.

Challenger and Futures/World Tennis Tour Finals

Singles: 14 (7-7)

References

External links

1997 births
Israeli male tennis players
Living people
Sportspeople from Tel Aviv